Rhadinosticta is a genus of damselfly in the family Isostictidae, 
endemic to eastern Australia.
Species of Rhadinosticta are slender, medium-sized damselflies, with a dull colouring.

Species 
The genus Rhadinosticta includes the following species:

 Rhadinosticta banksi (Tillyard, 1913) Northern wiretail
 Rhadinosticta handschini (Lieftinck, 1933) 
 Rhadinosticta simplex (Martin, 1901) Powdered wiretail

References

Isostictidae
Zygoptera genera
Odonata of Australia
Endemic fauna of Australia
Taxa named by J.A.L. (Tony) Watson
Insects described in 1991
Damselflies